Phyllanthus raiateaensis is a species of tree in the family Phyllanthaceae. It is endemic to the Te Mehani Plateau on the island of Raiatea in the Society Islands of French Polynesia.

References

Flora of French Polynesia
Least concern plants
raiateaensis
Flora of the Society Islands
Taxonomy articles created by Polbot
Taxobox binomials not recognized by IUCN